The Columbia 24 Challenger, or Columbia Challenger 24, is an American trailerable sailboat that was designed by Joseph McGlasson and first built in 1962.

The design is a raised-deck development of the Columbia 24, which, in turn, was a development of the Islander 24.

Production
The design was built by Columbia Yachts in the United States between 1962 and 1968, with 534 boats completed, but it is now out of production.

Design
The Columbia 24 Challenger was intended as a raised-deck, economy model for the Columbia line and sold at a lower price than the Columbia 24, due to lower production costs.

The Columbia 24 Challenger is a recreational keelboat, built predominantly of fiberglass, with wood trim. It has a masthead sloop rig; a spooned raked stem; a raised counter, angled transom; a keel-hung rudder controlled by a tiller and a fixed modified long keel, with a cut-away forefoot. It displaces  and carries  of lead ballast.

The boat is normally fitted with a small  outboard motor for docking and maneuvering.

The design has sleeping accommodation for four people, with a double "V"-berth in the bow cabin and two straight settees in the main cabin. A galley was optional. The head is located in the bow cabin, under the "V"-berth.

Operational history
In a 2010 review Steve Henkel wrote, "the Challenger was Columbia's 'economy model,' with essentially the same hull and sail plan as the Columbia Contender 24 ... but instead of a trunk cabin with doghouse, the Challenger has a raised deck. Back in 1963, she was $1,000 less expensive than the doghouse version 'due to substantial savings in production cost,' according to an ad of the time ... Best features: When she was first introduced, this economical and relatively roomy 24-footer would be hard to beat for value. Worst features: The 4-berth layout is similar to the Contender 24, but simplified, with cooking gear optional. Some sailors might prefer the extra amenities available in the doghouse model (and in many other boats)."

See also
List of sailing boat types

Related development
Columbia 24
Columbia 24 Contender

References

External links

Keelboats
1960s sailboat type designs
Sailing yachts
Trailer sailers
Sailboat type designs by Joseph McGlasson
Sailboat types built by Columbia Yachts